MRC Markets is an Austrian financial brokerage firm offering on-line trading in Forex and contracts for difference. It has membership  of the Vienna Stock exchange and licensed in Russia and Lithuania.  It has offices in Russia, the UK and India.

History
The company was founded in 1972 in Vienna, Austria as Money Field. The primary activity was provision of brokerage services in the stock market: initially the company operated its business in the Vienna Stock market, but soon added access to the Moscow Stock Market and then to other stock exchanges.  It also added access to the American market, so that clients could trades on the New York Stock Exchange and the Chicago Stock Exchange.

In 1989 the company added Foreign Exchange trading (Forex) services. And in 1992 Money Field expanded its products by allowing its clients to trade commodities that were listed on NYMEX (New York Mercantile Exchange).

In 2002 Money Field Corporation and Rainmaker Technology trading as Money Rain merged to form a financial holding company Rain Corporation (MRC).  In 2002 the company changed its trading name to MRC Markets and since then it has opened offices in London, Moscow, Saint Petersburg and Mumbai.

In December 2010 MRC launched MRC India, which is brand name of MRC Consultancy Pvt Ltd and is regulated by Securities and Exchange Board of India and has tied up with National Stock Exchange (NSE) and United Stock Exchange to conduct its trading business in India. It provides trading in Indian currency markets along with the global market research reports from London and Russia.

Products and services
MRC Markets provides global brokerage service to its clients and provides trading in a number of financial instruments including currencies, futures and options contracts, contracts for difference and securities.  Trading is done through the MetaTrader electronic trading platform or for Russian exchanges, MICEX and RTS, the trading platform Quick can be used.

MRC Markets also provides Portfolio management for private and corporate investors.  Funds are invested into stocks of leading Russian issuers (“blue chips”), second-grade stocks, corporate bonds, unit investment funds, and derivatives.

In addition the company provides market information, analytical support and news feeds to its traders using a feed from Dow Jones and provides regular analytical reports and forecasts of market changes.  MRC also offers educational services: seminars, advanced courses, training and master-classes on a broad range of topics relating to alternative methods of investing in financial markets and ways to preserve and grow capital.

References

External links 
 mrcmarkets.com
 Forex-ratings

1972 establishments in Austria
Companies based in Vienna
Financial derivative trading companies